was a Japanese film actor. He appeared in 56 films between 1967 and 1995. He was most famous for playing villains.

Selected filmography

Film

 Zoku ô-oku maruhi monogatari (1967)
 Eleven Samurai (1967)
 Bakuchi-uchi: Nagurikomi (1968) - Umekichi
 Kaettekita gokudô (1968)
 Tosei-nin Retsuden (1969)
 Gokuaku bôzu: nenbutsu hitokiri tabi (1969)
 Hitokiri kannon-uta (1970)
 Nihon jokyo-den: tekka geisha (1970)
 Onna toseinin (1971) - Jihei
 Gokuaku bozu - Nomu utsu kau (1971)
 Gendai poruno-den: Sentensei inpu (1971) - Doi
 Hibotan bakuto: Jingi tooshimasu (1972)
 Kizu darake jinsei furui do de gonzansu (1972)
 Onsen suppon geisha (1972) - Murata
 Kogarashi Monjirô (1972)
 Bakuchi-uchi Gaiden (1972)
 Battles Without Honor and Humanity (1973) - Ryoichi Enami
 Poruno no joô: Nippon sex ryokô (1973)
 Battles Without Honor and Humanity: Deadly Fight in Hiroshima (1973) - Iwashita Mitsuo
 Sukeban: Kankain dassô (1973) - Detective B
 Kyofu joshikôkô: Furyo monzetsu guruupu (1973) - Tokumaru
 Battles Without Honor and Humanity: Proxy War (1974) - Saijo Katsuji
 Gendai ninkyô-shi (1973) - Uno
 Bohachi Bushido: Code of the Forgotten Eight (1973)
 Yamaguchi-gumi San-daime (1973)
 Battles Without Honor and Humanity: Police Tactics (1974) - Policeman at hospital
 Gekitotsu! Satsujin ken (1974) - Ôshima
 Gakusei yakuza (1974)
 Karajishi keisatsu (1974)
 Battles Without Honor and Humanity: Final Episode (1974)
 Gokudo VS Mamushi (1974)
 Datsugoku Hiroshima satsujinshû (1974)
 Shijô saidai no himo: Nureta sakyu (1974)
 New Battles Without Honor and Humanity (1974)
 Jitsuroku hishyakaku ôkami domo no jingi (1974)
 Jînzu burûsu: Asu naki buraiha (1974) - Ishimatsu
 Nihon ninkyo-do: gekitotsu-hen (1975) - Matsu
 Mamushi to aodaishô (1975) - Kinichi Sunago
 Cops vs. Thugs (1975)
 Yusuri no technique: Niku jigoku (1975)
 Tamawarinin Yuki (1975) - Rokuzo
 Kigeki: Tokudashi - Himo tengoku (1975) - Hachiro Onishi
 Gambling Den Heist (1975) - Tetsuya bessho
 Kôshoku: Genroku (maruhi) monogatari (1975) - Hisamatsu (as The Piranha Gang)
 New Battles Without Honor and Humanity: The Boss's Head (1975)
 Gokudô shachô (1975)
 Bodo shimane keimusho (1975)
 Jitsuroku gaiden: Osaka dengeki sakusen (1976) - Chinese
 Bôsô panikku: Daigekitotsu (1976)
 New Battles Without Honor and Humanity: The Boss's Last Days (1976) - Kazunari Tsugawa
 Kurutta yajû (1976) - Saburo Tanimura
 Sengo Ryôki Hanzaishi (1976)
 Tokugawa onna keibatsu-emaki: Ushi-zaki no kei (1976)
 Yakuza Graveyard (1976) - Kajiyama
 Kawachi no ossan no uta (1976)
 Hiroshima jingi: Hitojichi dakkai sakusen (1976)
 Kawachi no ossan no uta: yôkita no ware (1976)
 Piraniya-gundan (1976)
 Yamaguchi-gumi gaiden: Kyushu shinko-sakusen (1977)
 Dokufu oden kubikiri asa (1977)
 Piranha-gundan: Daboshatsu no ten (1977) - Ten Matsuda
 The Life of Chikuzan (1977) - Senta
 Dokaben (1977)
 Nihon no jingi (1977) - Osamu Maekawa
 Doberuman deka (1977) - Hiyoshi Kinoshita
 Empire of Passion (1978) - Inspector Hotta
 Bandits vs. Samurai Squadron (1978) - Sanji
 Torakku yarô: Totsugeki ichiban hoshi (1978)
 Saraba eiga no tomoyo: Indian samaa (1979)
 Kidonappu burûsu (1982)
 The Burmese Harp (1985) - Sgt. Ito
 Kayako no tameni (1985) - Irujun Im
 Usugeshô (1985) - Ichiro Makabe
 Tora-san's Island Encounter (1985)
 Bakumatsu seishun graffiti: Ronin Sakamoto Ryoma (1986) - Kogoro Katsura
 Jittemai (1986) - Yasuke
 Hissatsu! III Ura ka Omote ka (1986)
 Hotaru-gawa (1987) - Sekine
 Hei no naka no korinai menmen (1987)
 Eien no 1/2 (1987)
 On'na sakasemasu (1987)
 Tsuru (1988) - Umaemon
 Zatoichi (1989)
 226 (1989) - Sergeant Major Nagata
 Kagerô (1991) - Ryukichi Ineda
 Deer Friend (1991) - Taro Oriya
 Dreams of Russia (1992) - Koichi
 Keisho sakazuki (1992) - Kyozo Shigeta
 Haruka, nosutarujii (1993) - Tosaku Satoh
 Niji no hashi (1993)
 Pro Golfer Oribê Kinjirô 2 (1994) - Katsunari kawamata
 Don o totta otoko (1994)

Television
 Akakage (1967)
 Zenriyaku Ofukurosama (1975)
 G-Men '75 (1975–1976)
 Taiyō ni Hoero! (1978)
 Ōgon no Hibi (1978)
 Sanga Moyu (1984)

References

External links

1941 births
1995 deaths
Japanese people from Manchukuo
Japanese male film actors
Deaths from lung cancer
20th-century Japanese male actors